This article lists some of the events that took place in the Netherlands in 2008.

Incumbents
Monarch: Beatrix
Prime Minister: Jan Peter Balkenende

Events

January
January 1: Wim Deetman resigns as mayor of The Hague.
January 12: Two soldiers of Task Force Uruzgan, Lance Corporal Aldert Poortema (22) and Private First Class Wesley School (20), both of the Regiment Infanterie Johan Willem Friso, are killed in Uruzgan, Afghanistan
January 15: Farshad Bashir (20) of the Socialist Party is sworn in as member of the House of Representatives, becoming the youngest member in history.
January 26: Bishop Wim Eijk of Groningen-Leeuwarden is installed as Archbishop of Utrecht.

February
February 3: Joran van der Sloot is unmasked in a high-profile TV-episode, made by Peter R. de Vries, about the disappearance of Natalee Holloway.

May
 9: During a huge fire on a shipyard in De Punt (Drenthe) 3 firemen of the Eelde corps perish.

June
 4: The rebuilt Wilms' Boô is officially opened by Princess Margriet of the Netherlands.
 Undated:
 Sweet Empire, punk rock band from the Amsterdam is formed.

July
 1: Most exceptions on the smoking ban are dropped. 
 10: The movie Hoe overleef ik mezelf? (How to survive myself?) gets a Gouden Film for getting 100.000 visitors.

September
 24: Beginning of the Netherlands Film Festival.
 28: Fortis is partially nationalized by The Netherlands, Belgium and Luxembourg whom together get 49% of the stocks in their control.  
 30: The Gouden Griffel for the best children-book goes to Jan Paul Schutten for his book Children of Amsterdam (Kinderen van Amsterdam).

October
 3: The Dutch branch of Fortis becomes completely nationalized and taken over by the Dutch government.
 5: Huge fire in a shopping mall in Spijkenisse.
 8: The Maasvlakte Light is deactivated.
 11: TV presenter Ernst-Paul Hasselbach (43) dies together with a female Belgian colleague in a traffic accident in Norway.

November
 14: Domino Day 2008 is held in Leeuwarden, Friesland.

Sports
January 1: Koninklijke HFC win the traditional New Year's match against former international footballers 6–1.
January 2: The Federatie Eredivisie Basketball of the Netherlands Basketball Association takes BC Omniworld of Almere out of the Eredivisie. The club had gone into administration.
January 4: Jermo Ribbers (14), a member of the Dutch national youth ski jumping team, dies after a fall following a jump in Oberstdorf, Germany.
March 26–30 Netherlands at the 2008 UCI Track Cycling World Championships
 March 30: Ellen van Dijk becomes World Champion at the 2008 UCI Track Cycling World Championships in the Women's scratch
July 3–6 Netherlands at the 2008 European Road Championships
Ellen van Dijk won the gold medal in the Women's time trial, the only Dutch medal at the championships.
August 8–24 Netherlands at the 2008 Summer Olympics
September 3–7 Netherlands at the 2008 UEC European Track Championships
The Netherlands won 6 medals: 2 gold, silver and 2 bronze medals. Ellen van Dijk won four of them including the two gold medals. She won gold in the Women's under-23 points race and the Women's under-23 scratch and silver in the Women's omnium and Women's under-23 individual pursuit.
September 6–17 Netherlands at the 2008 Summer Paralympics

See also
 2007–08 Eredivisie
 2007–08 Eerste Divisie
 2007–08 KNVB Cup
 2008 Johan Cruijff Schaal

Deaths

January
January 1: Dirk van Egmond, 54, journalist for Veronica, KRO, Omroep Flevoland, TROS, AVRO and RTL Veronique.
January 4: Anton P. de Graaff, 79, author
January 28: Ginty Vrede, Surinamese-Dutch kick-boxer

February
February 7: Benny Neyman, 56, singer
February 22: Henk Bruna, 91, businessman, founder of the Bruna retail chain

March
March 17: Ed Leeflang, 78, poet
March 23: Wim Mager, 67, photographer, founder of Apenheul

April
April 6: Jeu Sprengers, 69, chairman of the Royal Dutch Football Association

August
August 14: Percy Irausquin, 39, fashion designer.

See also
2008 in Dutch television

References

 
Netherlands
Years of the 21st century in the Netherlands
2000s in the Netherlands
Netherlands